Two Black men were Lynched in Florence County, South Carolina near the border with Williamsburg County, South Carolina for allegedly having relations with a white woman. The news did not reach the national media until January 8, 1922, and so is recorded as the first lynching of 1922 in America. According to the United States Senate Committee on the Judiciary there were 61 lynchings during 1922 in the United States.

Lynching 

Rumors of relations between a white woman and a black man had surfaced in the community and McAllister was warned to stay away. As they were leaving on December 26, 1921, unknown gunman fired striking both men and killing McAllister. Shotgun pellets created multiple wounds through Hickson's body including some that entered his mouth and broke his jaw. Even though Lincoln Hickson was severely wounded he was able to take the body of Bill McAllister in his buggy  to his home.

Aftermath

Reports only came to light as Sheriff Gamble of Williamsburg County had sat next to a reporter on a train. A love letter was found on the body of Bill McAllister. The white woman who lived in the house was forced from the community and went to Kingstree and from there to Hartsville. After the lynching was reported on Magistrate Baldwin, of Lake City, South Carolina investigated the matter.

Bibliography 
Notes

References 

1921 riots
1921 in South Carolina
African-American history of South Carolina
Lynching deaths in Texas
December 1921 events
Protest-related deaths
Racially motivated violence against African Americans
Riots and civil disorder in South Carolina
White American riots in the United States